Sykkylvsfjorden is a fjord in Sykkylven Municipality in Møre og Romsdal county, Norway.  The fjord is a branch off of the main Storfjorden.  The villages of Aure and Ikornnes are located near the mouth of the fjord and the village of Straumgjerde lies at the innermost part of the fjord.  The Sykkylven Bridge crosses the fjord between Aure and Ikornnes. Ikorness is home to Ekornes sofas and Stressless recliners, the largest manufacturers of furniture in Scandinavia.

See also
 List of Norwegian fjords

References

Fjords of Møre og Romsdal
Sykkylven